Robert Clymer Hendrickson (August 12, 1898December 7, 1964) was an American attorney, politician, and diplomat who served as a United States senator from New Jersey.

Early life and education
Born in Woodbury, New Jersey, Hendrickson attended public schools and during the First World War enlisted in the United States Army in 1918 and served overseas. Since he left for war before his senior year of high school ended, Hendrickson received his Woodbury High School diploma while he was overseas in France. He graduated from Temple University Law School in Philadelphia (1922).

Career 
After graduating from law school, Hendrickson was admitted to the New Jersey bar, commencing practice in Woodbury. He held the office of county supervisor from 1929 to 1934, and was city solicitor of Woodbury in 1931. He was a member of the New Jersey Senate from 1934 to 1940, serving as president of the senate in 1939; he was an unsuccessful Republican nominee for governor in 1940. He served as state treasurer from 1942 to 1949 and was a member of the board of managers of the Council of State Governments in 1940, and was its chairman in 1941. He was vice chairman of the Commission on the Delaware River Basin from 1936 to 1951. He served on the New Jersey Constitutional Revision Commission.

During the Second World War he rejoined the Army in 1943, was commissioned a major, served with the American Military Government in the Mediterranean Theater of Operations, and was subsequently promoted to lieutenant colonel in 1944, being separated from the service in 1946. As a senior legal officer in the U.S. Army in North Africa, Italy, and Austria, he worked on the re-establishment of civil rights and local courts, the implementation of de-nazification programs, and the care of displaced persons. He was called back into active duty for the Korean War in 1951. In 1948, he was elected as a Republican to the U.S. Senate, and served from January 3, 1949, to January 3, 1955; he was not a candidate for renomination in 1954. President Dwight Eisenhower appointed Hendrickson to the post of United States ambassador to New Zealand, which he held from February 16, 1955, to November 20, 1956.

Personal life 
Hendrickson was a resident of Woodbury until his death in 1964; his grave is in Eglington Cemetery in Clarksboro, New Jersey.

References

External links
 Robert C. Hendrickson Papers at Syracuse University

1898 births
1964 deaths
County commissioners in New Jersey
Republican Party New Jersey state senators
United States Army officers
Republican Party United States senators from New Jersey
Politicians from Woodbury, New Jersey
Ambassadors of the United States to New Zealand
Presidents of the New Jersey Senate
Temple University Beasley School of Law alumni
Woodbury Junior-Senior High School alumni
20th-century American politicians
20th-century American diplomats
Military personnel from New Jersey